Distant viewing may refer to:

Television, derived from mixed Latin and Greek roots, meaning "far sight"
Remote viewing, non-sensorial information gathering

See also
Far sight (disambiguation)

id:Penginderaan jauh